Walter Jaycox "Buzz" Ritchie, Jr. (born June 7, 1947, in Bay Shore, New York) is an American banker and politician. He previously served as a Representative in the House of Representatives of the U.S. state of Florida.

Education
Ritchie received his bachelor's degree in Business Administration from the University of Florida in 1969. He received his Juris Doctor from UF as well in 1972.

Career
Ritchied served in Florida's House of Representatives in the 2nd district from November 8, 1988, to November 3, 1992, and from the 3rd district from November 3, 1992, to November 3, 1998.

He is president of Gulf Coast Community Bank in Pensacola, Florida.

He is also a Democrat.

Personal life
He lives in Pensacola, Florida with his family.

External links
Official website of Buzz Ritchie

References

University of Florida alumni
1947 births
Living people
Democratic Party members of the Florida House of Representatives
People from Bay Shore, New York
People from Pensacola, Florida
American bankers